The Rong River is a river in Guangxi province in China.
The river runs through the towns of Sanjiang and Rongshui. Parts of the river valley around the township of Longsheng are inhabited by the Zhuang people who live in traditional wooden houses on the river.

Rivers of Guangxi
Tributaries of the Pearl River (China)